A Social Cub is a 1916 short silent comedy film directed by Clarence G. Badger and starring Gloria Swanson.

Cast
 Elizabeth De Witt
 Gonda Durand
 Harry Gribbon
 Reggie Morris
 Blanche Payson
 Della Pringle
 Gloria Swanson
 Josef Swickard
 Bobby Vernon as Bobby

Preservation 
The existence of surviving prints is unknown.

References

External links

1916 films
American silent short films
American black-and-white films
1916 comedy films
1916 short films
Films directed by Clarence G. Badger
Keystone Studios films
Films produced by Mack Sennett
Silent American comedy films
American comedy short films
1910s American films